George Scrimshaw (1 December 1902 – 13 July 1971) was a New Zealand rugby union player. A wing-forward, Scrimshaw represented  at a provincial level. He was a member of the New Zealand national side, the All Blacks, on their 1928 tour of South Africa, playing in 11 matches, including one international.

References

1902 births
1971 deaths
Rugby union players from Christchurch
People educated at Waitaki Boys' High School
New Zealand rugby union players
New Zealand international rugby union players
Canterbury rugby union players
Rugby union wing-forwards